Dromaeschna forcipata is a species of dragonfly in the family Telephlebiidae, known commonly as the green-striped darner. It generally inhabits streams in coastal rainforests of north-eastern Queensland, Australia.

Dromaeschna forcipata is a large black dragonfly with dark green markings. The side of its body appears to have alternate black and green stripes.

Gallery

See also
 List of dragonflies of Australia

References

Telephlebiidae
Odonata of Australia
Endemic fauna of Australia
Taxa named by Robert John Tillyard
Insects described in 1907